Amanda McGill Johnson (born March 21, 1980) is a politician from the state of Nebraska in the Midwestern United States. From 2007 to 2015, she represented a Lincoln district in the Nebraska Legislature.  She ran as the Democratic Party's candidate for Nebraska State Auditor in 2014, losing to Republican candidate Charlie Janssen.

Early life, education and career

Born in Omaha, she graduated from Millard North High School in 1998 and went on to the University of Nebraska-Lincoln where she graduated in 2002.

She was a television reporter for KCAU in Sioux City in 2003 and KOLN in Lincoln from 2004 to 2005.  She then became communications director for the Nebraska Democratic Party until she decided to run for office.

Political career
Senator McGill was elected to the Legislature in 2006 serving Nebraska's 26th legislative district and served as the Chair of the Urban Affairs Committee from the fall of 2009 until she was term limited out of office.  She also served on the Business and Labor and Judiciary Committees.

References

|-

1980 births
Living people
Democratic Party Nebraska state senators
University of Nebraska–Lincoln alumni
Women state legislators in Nebraska
Politicians from Omaha, Nebraska
American television reporters and correspondents
21st-century American women